Blighty is a 1927 British World War I silent drama film  directed by Adrian Brunel and starring Ellaline Terriss, Lillian Hall-Davis and Jameson Thomas. The film was a Gainsborough Pictures production with screenplay by Eliot Stannard from a story by Ivor Montagu.

Background
Blighty was Brunel's second feature-length directorial assignment, four years after The Man Without Desire.  He had spent the intervening years making a series of satirical burlesque short films, the first few of which had impressed Michael Balcon who offered him the opportunity to produce and distribute further examples through Gainsborough.  In 1926 Balcon gave Brunel the chance to direct a full-length feature for Gainsborough and Blighty was the result.  Although Brunel was initially said to be in two minds about directing a "war film" as he did not care for the genre on moral or aesthetic grounds, he agreed to go ahead with the proviso that there would be no material directly depicting the conflict, nor any appeal to jingoistic sentiment.

Plot
With the outbreak of World War I, Sir Francis and Lady Villiers (Annesley Healey and Ellaline Terriss) and daughter Ann (Lillian Hall-Davis) watch son of the household Robin (Godfrey Winn) and family chauffeur David Marshall (Jameson Thomas) go off to fight.  David does well in the army and is quickly promoted through the ranks, while Robin falls in love with and marries a local girl.  Robin is killed in action on the Western Front, leaving his bride a young widow with a baby.

When David returns periodically to England on leave, he and Ann fall in love.  Meanwhile Robin's wife (Nadia Sibirskaïa) finds her way as a refugee to England to seek out the Villiers and introduce them to their grandchild.  Following the declaration of the Armistice with Germany, the romance between David and Ann has to conquer entrenched class-based attitudes, while Robin's wife at first feels overwhelmed and out-of-place in the Villiers household.  Problems are eventually overcome, and the Villiers' welcome David and their daughter-in-law and grandchild into the family.

Cast
 Ellaline Terriss as Lady Villiers
 Lillian Hall-Davis as Ann Villiers
 Jameson Thomas as David Marshall
 Godfrey Winn as Robin Villiers
 Nadia Sibirskaïa as The Little Refugee
 Annesley Healey as Sir Francis Villiers
 Wally Patch as Drill Sergeant
 Dino Galvani as Poilou
 Renée Houston as Typist
 Billie Houston as Typist

References

External links 
 
 

1927 films
1927 war films
British silent feature films
Films directed by Adrian Brunel
Gainsborough Pictures films
Western Front (World War I) films
British black-and-white films
Films set in England
Films set in France
Films set in the 1910s
British war drama films
1927 drama films
British World War II films
1920s British films
1920s war drama films
Silent war drama films